The 1975 TAA Formula Ford Driver to Europe Series was an Australian motor racing competition open to Formula Ford racing cars.
It was the sixth annual Australian national series for Formula Fords.

The series was won by Paul Bernasconi driving a Mawer 004.

Schedule
The series was contested over nine rounds with one race per round.

Points system
Drivers were required to drop the points from their worst round from their totals. This round could not be the Surfers Paradise round, which was the only round held outside of the states of Victoria and New South Wales.

Series results

References

External links
 Paul Bernasconi Mawer Formula Ford - Oran Park May 1975, autopics.com.au, as archived at web.archive.org

TAA Formula Ford Driver to Europe Series
Australian Formula Ford Series